Chen Hao (born December 9, 1979) is a Chinese actress, singer, and model.

Brief Bio

Chen Hao, came into limelight in 1998 after the release of her award winning film the “Postman in the Mountains” in which she revealed her ample acting ability on screen. Her leading role in the TV drama “Li Wei the Magistrate”(2000/2001) made  her  
popular with  the Chinese public. Chen Hao followed this with a role in a TV comedy play called the “Pink Ladies" in Taiwan. The movie proved a blockbuster among the Chinese community living across Asia.

Chen Hao, as one of the heroines, in the Pink Ladies, won the heart of the cine-goers with her superb acting in the role of a sensuous woman given to exploiting the males. With TV films like the 2003 “Demi-Gods and Semi-Devils”, Chen Hao became a roaring success.

Chen Hao also started to include singing as a part of her career. Her maiden music album hit the market in 2005, produced by  Japanese producer Tetsuya Komuro. Her album, Chen Hao, bagged the Channel V's the most popular female singer award in 2006.

A graduate from the Central Academy of Drama with majors in acting in 1997, more awards seem to come her way as she was again decorated with the Jury Award at the 2009 Seoul TV Festival for her outstanding performance in the film, "Live a Luxurious and Dispassionate Life". She portrays the character of a permissive woman given to gambling and an indulgent life.

Chen, in a popularity online poll, was able to collect over one million votes pronouncing her the "Most Beautiful Woman" in China.

Personal life

Born in the coastal city of Qingdao, Shandong province, Chen is married to a business tycoon, David Liu Haifeng. She gave birth to a girl in May 2011.

Filmography

Film

Television

References

External links

Chen Hao Official Blog (Chinese)
Chen Hao Biography  (English)
Chen Hao Picture Galleries (English)

1979 births
Living people
Actresses from Qingdao
Chinese female models
Singers from Shandong
Chinese film actresses
Chinese television actresses
Chinese voice actresses
21st-century Chinese women singers